Spoleto is a Brazilian restaurant chain that develops the concept of fast food to Italian cuisine. The restaurant's name is a tribute to the town of Spoleto, Italy.

The company was established in 1999 in Rio de Janeiro by Eduardo Ourivio and Mário Chady.  In 2001, the company adopted the franchise system.

Currently, the chain has over 200 restaurants located throughout Brazil, eight in Mexico, three in Spain and six in the United States.

History 
Spoleto's history begins in 1992 with the partnership of friends Eduardo and Mario Chady Ourívio for the opening of Guilhermina Café in Leblon.

References

External links
 Spoleto's Official Website 
 Spoleto Mexico Official Website 
Spoleto USA Official Website (in English)

Fast-food chains of Brazil
Fast casual restaurants
Food and drink companies based in Rio de Janeiro (city)
Restaurants established in 1999
1999 establishments in Brazil
Italian restaurants
Brazilian brands